A discothèque, or a nightclub, is an entertainment venue or club with recorded music rather than a live band.

Discothèque or variants may also refer to:

Music

Albums
Discothèque (Herbie Mann album), 1975
Discotheque (Stereo Total album), 2005
Discotheque (Marcia Hines album), 2006

Songs
"Discothèque" (song), a 1997 song by U2
"Discotech" (song), a 2007 song by Young Love
"Discoteque" (song), a 2021 song by The Roop, representing Lithuania in the Eurovision Song Contest

Other uses
 Discotek Media, an entertainment company